According to Sanders (1960) there were three English feudal baronies in Cornwall.
Feudal barony of Launceston
Feudal barony of Trematon
Feudal barony of Cardinham

See also

Feudal baronies in Devonshire

References

Sources
Sanders, I.J. English Baronies: A Study of their Origin and Descent 1086-1327, Oxford, 1960

 
History of Cornwall
Honours (feudal barony)